Miodrag Martać (Serbian Cyrillic: Миодраг Мартаћ; born 7 June 1959) is a Serbian football manager and former player.

Playing career

Club
He was playing with Yugoslav Second League side FK Trepča from where he moved to FK Budućnost Titograd playing in the Yugoslav First League.  In 1987, he moved abroad and played 3 seasons with Karşıyaka S.K. in the Turkish First League. In 1990, he returned to Yugoslavia and joined FK Sutjeska Nikšić playing with them the 1990–91 Yugoslav Second League.

Managerial career
After retiring he became a football manager.

References

1959 births
Living people
Footballers from Podgorica
Association football midfielders
Yugoslav footballers
FK Trepča players
Karşıyaka S.K. footballers
FK Budućnost Podgorica players
FK Sutjeska Nikšić players
Yugoslav First League players
Yugoslav Second League players
Yugoslav expatriate footballers
Expatriate footballers in Turkey
Yugoslav expatriate sportspeople in Turkey
Serbia and Montenegro football managers
Montenegrin football managers
FK Zemun managers
FK Borac Čačak managers
FK Zeta managers
Serbian SuperLiga managers
Red Star Belgrade non-playing staff
People from Raška, Serbia